Events from the year 1688 in Sweden

Incumbents
 Monarch – Charles XI

Events

 The monarch extends the Great Reversion to Swedish Livonia. 
 Coffee is served in public in Stockholm for the first time. 
 The religious process against the dissident Lars Ulstadius

Births

 23 January - Ulrika Eleonora, Queen of Sweden, monarch and queen consort (died 1741) 
 29 January - Emanuel Swedenborg, scientist, philosopher, theologian, revelator, and mystic (died 1772)

Deaths
 Maria Dauerer, pharmacist (apothecary) (born 1624)
 

 5 September  - Otto Wilhelm Königsmarck, military officer (born 1639)

References

 
Years of the 17th century in Sweden
Sweden